Hydnellum spongiosipes, commonly known as the velvet tooth, is a tooth fungus in the family Bankeraceae. It is found in Europe and North America. In Switzerland, it is considered a vulnerable species.

Taxonomy
The fungus was originally described as new to science in 1898 by American mycologist Charles Horton Peck, who placed it in the genus Hydnum. Zdeněk Pouzar transferred it to Hydnellum in 1960. Synonyms include Hydnellum nuttallii, published by Howard James Banker in 1906, and Hydnellum velutinum var. spongiosipes, published by Rudolph Arnold Maas Geesteranus in 1957.

References

External links

Fungi described in 1898
Fungi of Europe
Fungi of North America
Inedible fungi
spongiosipes
Taxa named by Charles Horton Peck